Jan Verheul or J. Verheul Dzn. (Rotterdam, 14 February 1860 - 19 October 1948) was a Dutch architect, watercolourist and designer.

1860 births
1948 deaths
Dutch architects
Artists from Rotterdam